Nei endonuclease VIII-like 3 (E. coli) is a protein in humans that is encoded by the NEIL3 gene.

NEIL3 belongs to a class of DNA glycosylases homologous to the bacterial Fpg/Nei family. These glycosylases initiate the first step in base excision repair by cleaving bases damaged by reactive oxygen species and introducing a DNA strand break via the associated lyase reaction.

References